Lim Jong-In (born August 28, 1956 in Gochang County, North Jeolla) is a politician and a lawyer. Lim took undergraduate bachelor's degree of laws at Korea University

Lim served 17th term of the South Korean National Assembly (2004~2008) as a member of Uri Party. He opposed the dispatch of South Korean troops at Iraq War, U.S-Korea FTA, and Uri Party's alliance with Grand National Party. Lim was the first member to quit Uri Party. In 2011, Lim joined Democratic Unity Party.

See also
Politics of South Korea

Notes

1956 births
Korea University alumni
Living people
People from Gochang County
Uri Party politicians
Members of the National Assembly (South Korea)